The Al Anbar Governorate election of 2009 was held on 31 January 2009 alongside elections for all other governorates outside Iraqi Kurdistan and Kirkuk.

Background 

The governorate is overwhelmingly populated by Sunni Arabs. The sitting governorate council was elected in the 2005 Iraqi governorate elections. These elections took place at the same time as the January 2005 Iraqi legislative election and were boycotted by nearly all Sunni Arab parties. The Iraqi Islamic Party was the only significant Sunni Arab party to put up candidates but they also withdrew from the ballot days before the election.

The turnout in Anbar was 2% for the legislative elections and only 0.5% for the governorate election. Therefore, although the Iraqi Islamic Party has traditionally been stronger in Mosul, they ended up with nearly all the seats on the governorate council.

From 2004, the governorate became a major site of the insurgency in Iraq directed against the Iraq government and occupying United States army. However, the formation in September 2006 of the Anbar Salvation Council was a turning point, and led to the American-backed tribal forces driving al-Qaeda in Iraq and other insurgents out of al-Anbar.

Campaign 

More than 520 candidates stood in Anbar, from 37 party lists. The main contest was between the Iraqi Islamic Party which ran the council since 2005 and various parties linked to the Awakening movements formed by tribal leaders and funded by the United States to fight against al-Qaeda in Iraq. Analysts predicted the IIP standing on their own would be "wiped out" in Anbar by the Awakening movements. the Iraqi Islamic Party formed the Coalition of Intellectuals and Tribes together with uniting the Islamic Party, the gathering of Anbar’s Tribal Leaders and Intellectuals, Iraq’s People’s Conference and the Independent Tribal National Gathering.

Lists associated with the Awakening movements included the Iraq Awakening and Independents National Alliance and the National Front for the Salvation of Iraq. The Alliance was led by Sheikh Ahmed Abu Risha, Sheikh Amir Ali al-Sulaiman and Sheikh Hameed al-Hayyes Sheikh al-Hayyes left the Alliance before the election and contested as head of the "Anbar Salvation Council" list.

The National Front was led by Sheikh Ali Hatim,  the tribal leader of the Dulaim tribal confederation - the largest in Anbar - and has previously clashed with Abu Risha's brother, Abdul Sattar Abu Risha, when he was the head of the Anbar Salvation Council. The Front claimed the support of the Anbar Salvation Council, the Al-Anbar Awakening Congress, and the Council of Al-Anbar Sheikhs.

The Tribes of Iraq Coalition, headed by Hamid al-Hais is another list which claims to be backed by tribal leaders.

Saleh al-Mutlak's Iraqi National Dialogue Front is the only significant list that doesn't rely on support from tribal leaders, being based on former Ba'ath Party supporters.

Results 

Following the vote, supporters of the IIP and the Sahawa gathered in the capital, Ramadi, and started firing in the air to celebrate victory. Iraqi police quickly dispersed the groups and announced a curfew.

Early leaked results indicated that the lists backed by the IIP had won 12 of the 29 seats on the council - the largest number for any party. Sahawa supporters accused the IIP of adding 100,000 fraudulent ballot papers and threatened a violent reaction if it was confirmed. Sheikh Ahmed Abu Risha threatened to "transfer our entity from a political to a military one" and "to fight the Islamic Party and the [Electoral] commission". The IIP condemned the threats of violence saying this behaviour would "take us back to the Middle Ages" 

The Deputy Prime Minister of Iraq and IIP member, Rafi al-Issawi, called for a recount with people accused of fraud prosecuted. Iraqi National Dialogue Front leader Saleh al-Mutlaq said most of the lists thought the IIP had manipulated the vote, he had seen fraudulent ballots himself and the vote had been "tainted".

The Electoral Commission said they had received a flood of complaints which they were investigating - including some serious complaints that could alter the outcome of the vote. Commission officials met with Abu Risha, assured him they would not tolerate any forgery and asked him to avoid confrontation with the IIP.

Following the election, the Iraq Awakening and Independents National Alliance nominated as governor Qasim Al-Fahdawi, a businessman who had recently been running a construction company in the United Arab Emirates. He was elected by 24 votes to 3 and formed a government including all parties except for the Iraqi Islamic Party's three members. Dr. Jassim al-Halbusi was elected chairman of the provincial council.

References 

2009 Iraqi governorate elections
Al Anbar Governorate